Phantom Rider is the name of several Old West heroic gunfighter characters appearing in American comic books published by Marvel Comics. The character was originally called Ghost Rider, and was renamed following the introduction of Marvel's motorcycle-riding character of the same name.

The character has made minor appearances across media. He made his live-action debut in the 2007 film Ghost Rider, played by Sam Elliott.

Publication history
Marvel Comics' first Ghost Rider look was based on the Magazine Enterprises character Ghost Rider (Rex Fury), created by writer Ray Krank and artist Dick Ayers for editor Vincent Sullivan in Tim Holt #11 (1949). The character appeared in horror-themed Western stories through the run of Tim Holt, Red Mask, and A-1 Comics up until the institution of the Comics Code.

After the trademark to the character's name and motif lapsed, Marvel Comics debuted its own near-identical, horror-free version of the character in Ghost Rider #1 (cover-dated February 1967), by plotter and original Ghost Rider artist Ayers, and writers Gary Friedrich and Roy Thomas.

In an interview, Ayers recalled how the character was conceived, "Vin would come in and sit down and describe what he wanted in The Ghost Rider. He told me to go see Disney's Sleepy Hollow-Ichabod Crane, The Headless Horseman, and then he told me to play the Vaughn Monroe record, "Ghost Riders in the Sky." And then he started talking about what he wanted the guy wearing."

With the introduction of Marvel's supernatural Ghost Rider in the 1970s, Marvel renamed its Western Ghost Rider — first, to the unfortunate Night Rider (a term previously used in the Southern United States to refer to members of the Ku Klux Klan) in a 1974–1975 reprint series, and then to Phantom Rider. At least five men have been the Phantom Rider, one of whom is active in the modern day.

The Magazine Enterprises library of characters, including its version of Ghost Rider, was reprinted by AC Comics in the 1980s. While the copyrights have lapsed due to non-renewal, AC renamed the Ghost Rider as the Haunted Horseman, due to Marvel having maintained the Ghost Rider trademark.

Fictional character biography

Carter Slade
Carter Slade, the first to wear the mask, debuted in Ghost Rider #1 (February 1967). He battled evil while dressed in a phosphorescent white costume, complete with a full-face mask, cape, and the requisite white hat. Slade received his outfit and his white horse from Flaming Star, a Native American medicine man.

He was never called the Phantom Rider in these original appearances. In Marvel continuity, it was not until after Slade's death that the name Phantom Rider was given to the character, and reprints now retroactively use that name for Slade.

Eventually, the modern era Ghost Rider Johnny Blaze found himself transported into the 19th century where he met and teamed up with Carter Slade. Carter was badly wounded and Blaze took him to Flaming Star to be healed and then dealt with Carter's enemies. Carter recovered and Johnny returned to the present.

Carter Slade's spirit, however, returned and possessed his descendant Hamilton Slade to make him a new Phantom Rider and rode out to rescue Johnny Blaze from certain doom.

Jamie Jacobs

After Slade's death in Western Gunfighters #7 (January 1972), his sidekick Jamie Jacobs became the second Phantom Rider. He was soon killed in action.

Lincoln Slade
Lincoln Slade is Carter Slade's brother and a U.S. Marshal, as well as the third Phantom Rider. Lincoln was driven insane by his powers. When the West Coast Avengers are traveling through time on one of their adventures, Lincoln becomes infatuated with one of their members, Mockingbird. Lincoln kidnapped the Avenger and fled to a secret location. He then drugs Mockingbird, removing her ability to give or deny consent, and rapes her. Once the effects of the drugs wear off, an enraged Mockingbird fights and defeats him. In the course of the battle he is knocked over a cliff. As he clings to the cliffside, he first pleads with Mockingbird to help him, then attempts to reassert his hypnotic authority and orders her to help him. Hating him for his violation of her, Mockingbird allows him to fall to his death. Years later, Lincoln's restless spirit possesses his descendant, Hamilton Slade, to seek "vengeance" against Mockingbird. His spirit returns a second time to make Mockingbird return his feelings.

Comic Book Resources placed him as one of the superheroes Marvel wants you to forget.

Reno Jones

In the miniseries Blaze of Glory, the African American gunslinger Reno Jones used the Ghost Rider identity briefly in a battle with the Klan-affiliated mercenaries called the Nightriders. Jones was one-half of the team called the Gunhawks, along with his former friend, Kid Cassidy, whom Jones had believed dead. Cassidy was revealed to be alive and the leader of the Nightriders; he was killed, and Jones retired.

Hamilton Slade
In present-day continuity, Lincoln Slade's distant descendant Hamilton Slade was an archaeologist who found the burial site of his legendary ancestor, in issue #56 of the supernatural-motorcyclist series Ghost Rider. As he explored the site, he found a large burial urn and from it appeared the ghostly garb of his ancestors Carter and Lincoln Slade. Possessed by the spirits of his ancestors, he became the new version of the Phantom Rider, and rode off to rescue Johnny Blaze, the current Ghost Rider, from one of his foes. However, he would have no memory of his adventures as the Rider and eventually Lincoln's ghost would takeover more frequently and haunt Mockingbird for his death. An exorcism released the spirits of Carter and Lincoln from Hamilton and Lincoln was defeated and banished while Hamilton agreed to have Carter possess him, only now Hamilton was in control and retained memory of his adventures as the Rider. Hamilton attempted a similar exorcism to save his daughter Jaime from the returning spirit of Lincoln Slade. He was killed by Crossfire as the exorcism was being completed.

J. T. Slade

Nick Fury recruits Carter Slade's grandson, James Taylor Slade (also known as J. T. Slade), introduced in The Mighty Avengers #13, to be part of Fury's team against the "Secret Invasion" of the shape-shifting alien Skrulls. He has superhuman reflexes and the ability to cause a chain to ignite in flame and cause massive damage. The character roll call at the beginning of Secret Invasion #4 (September 2008) refers to J. T. as "Hellfire". Hellfire goes on to make numerous appearances in the ongoing series, Secret Warriors. In Secret Warriors #16, he is revealed to be a HYDRA double agent. Nick Fury allows Hellfire to fall to his death as a result of the character's double dealings.

Jaime Slade
In the 2010 series Hawkeye & Mockingbird, it is revealed that Hamilton Slade had a daughter named Jaime Slade. While she was examining an urn belonging to the Slade family estate, Lincoln Slade's spirit possessed her, transforming Jaime into the new Phantom Rider. Claiming to be both "the spirit and the heir", the Phantom Rider teamed up with Crossfire to battle the heroes Hawkeye and Mockingbird. Jaime's father Hamilton Slade attempted an exorcism which would rid his daughter of the possessing spirit. Hamilton was successful, but was killed by Crossfire as the exorcism had been completed. Jaime regained her senses to see Mockingbird stand over her father's dead body and believed the Avenger was responsible. Despite having Lincoln's spirit vanquished from her, Jaime transformed back into the Phantom Rider and attacked Mockingbird. She was defeated and taken into custody.

Other versions
In the "Old Man Logan" finale "Dead Man Logan", there is a gang called the Phantom Riders who operate in Nashville, Tennessee and model themselves after Phantom Rider by wearing costumes that resemble his attire and ride high-tech horses. Upon Logan's return to Earth-21923, the Phantom Riders attack Logan when he enters his territory in light of the power vacuum he caused by killing Red Skull and Hulk.

In other media

Television
A variation of the Phantom Rider appears in the Ultimate Spider-Man episode "Return to the Spider-Verse" Pt. 2, voiced by Clancy Brown. This version is the Ben Parker of a Wild West-themed alternate reality who was brainwashed to serve Doc Ock Holliday to serve as his Phantom Rider before being freed by Spider-Man, Kid Arachnid, and Web Slinger.

Film
Carter Slade, credited as and amalgamated with the "Caretaker", appears in Ghost Rider, portrayed by Sam Elliott. This version was a former Texas Ranger from the 1800s who sold his soul to Mephistopheles as a consequence of his greed and became the latter's personal Ghost Rider. After trapping 1000 evil souls within the Contract of San Venganza, Slade knew they would bring hell on Earth and outran Mephistopheles to keep it from him before going into hiding as a cemetery's caretaker. After Johnny Blaze becomes the new Ghost Rider in the present, Slade helps him understand his powers and prepare him to face Mephistopheles' son, Blackheart. Once his successor is ready, Slade reveals his identity and gives Blaze the contract and his shotgun before vanishing into the afterlife.

Video games
 The Phantom Rider appears as an alternate costume for Johnny Blaze / Ghost Rider in Marvel: Ultimate Alliance.
 Carter Slade appears in the Ghost Rider film tie-in game, voiced by Fred Tatasciore.
 The Phantom Rider appears in Lego Marvel Super Heroes 2.

References

External links
 Ghost Rider (1967) at Don Markstein's Toonopedia. Archived from the original on March 28, 2016.
 International Hero: Magazine Enterprises' Ghost Rider
 

African-American superheroes
Articles about multiple fictional characters
Characters created by Dick Ayers
Characters created by Gary Friedrich
Characters created by Len Wein
Characters created by Roy Thomas
Comics characters introduced in 1967
Fictional characters from Ohio
Fictional characters with immortality
Fictional rapists
Ghost Rider
Marvel Comics American superheroes
Marvel Comics Western (genre) characters
Western (genre) gunfighters
Western (genre) heroes and heroines